Events from the year 1941 in Ireland.

Incumbents
 President: Douglas Hyde
 Taoiseach: Éamon de Valera (FF)

Events
2 January – three Carlow women are killed in a night of German bombing in parts of Leinster.
3 January – further German bombing of Dublin.
13 January – the poet and novelist James Joyce dies in Zürich.
24 January – part of the old State Chambers in Dublin Castle are destroyed by fire.
20 February – emergency Scientific Research Bureau set up to seek alternatives to raw materials in short supply.
21 February – first flight by a British Royal Air Force flying boat through the "Donegal Corridor", Irish airspace between its base in Northern Ireland and the Atlantic Ocean, a concession secretly agreed by Éamon de Valera.
6 March – 3,800 animals are slaughtered after the fiftieth case of foot-and-mouth disease is announced.
20 March – bread rationing is introduced.
21 March – Glencullen (Capt. T. Waldron) and Glencree (Capt. D. McLean) machine-gunned by Luftwaffe in Bristol Channel.
22 March: 16:00 hours – collier St. Fintan (Capt. N. Hendry) attacked by two Luftwaffe bombers, off the coast of Pembrokeshire and sunk with all hands – 9 dead.
26 March – Edenvale (Capt. T. Tyrrell) bombed and machine-gunned by Luftwaffe in Bristol Channel.
27 March – Lady Belle (Capt. T. Donohue) bombed and machine-gunned by Luftwaffe in Irish Sea.
2 April – Edenvale (Capt. T. Tyrrell) bombed and machine-gunned (again) by Luftwaffe in Bristol Channel.
15 April – Belfast Blitz: 1,000 people are killed in bombing raids on Belfast. 71 firemen with 13 fire tenders from Dundalk, Drogheda, Dublin and Dún Laoghaire cross the Irish border to assist their Belfast colleagues.
18 April – An RAF Handley Page Hampden aircraft (Registration AD730) gets lost in bad weather and crashes on Black Hill (Kilbeg) above the village of Lacken, County Wicklow killing its entire crew of four. 
5 May – Belfast suffers its third bombing raid during World War II. The Dublin government authorises its emergency services to assist.
7 May – Wages Standstill Order.
12 May – Menapia (Capt C Bobels) bombed and machine-gunned by Luftwaffe off Welsh coast: 2 wounded.
14 May – five further outbreaks of foot-and-mouth disease are reported.
17 May – Glenageary (Capt R. Simpson) bombed and machine-gunned by Luftwaffe in Irish Sea.
19 May – City of Waterford (Capt. W. Gibbons) bombed and machine-gunned by Luftwaffe off Welsh coast: 1 wounded.
26 May – a special sitting of Dáil Éireann unanimously condemns the introduction of conscription in Northern Ireland.
27 May – speaking in the House of Commons of the United Kingdom, Prime Minister Winston Churchill rules out the introduction of conscription in Northern Ireland.
30 May – Kyleclare (Capt. T. Hanrahan) bombed off Waterford coast.
31 May – bombing of Dublin in World War II: 34 people are killed when the Luftwaffe bomb part of Dublin.
2 June – Arklow is bombed by the Luftwaffe, with no casualties.
24 July – Dundalk is bombed by the Luftwaffe, with no casualties.
Summer – 16,000 men and boys are employed on county council turf-cutting schemes.
12 October – Charles Stewart Parnell, the uncrowned King of Ireland, is honoured in a huge pageant in Dublin.
November – Brendan Behan is released from Borstal in England and deported to Ireland.
8 December – the day after the attack on Pearl Harbor, Winston Churchill cables the Taoiseach inviting him to join the Allies of World War II.

Arts and literature
Myles na gCopaleen's parodic novel An Béal Bocht is published.
Donagh MacDonagh's Veterans, and other poems is published.
Louis MacNeice's poetry Plant and Phantom and study The Poetry of W. B. Yeats are published.
Kate O'Brien's novel The Land of Spices is published; it is prohibited in Ireland by the Censorship of Publications Board.
English poet John Betjeman becomes British press attaché in Dublin, living in Clondalkin.
Opening of new Dublin Airport passenger terminal, designed by Desmond FitzGerald, the first significant International Style building in Ireland.

Sport

Football

League of Ireland
Winners: Cork United
FAI Cup
Winners: Cork United 2–2, 3–1 Waterford.

Golf
Irish Open is not played due to The Emergency.

Births
3 January – Derrick O'Connor, actor (died 2018).
10 March – Pat Donnellan, Galway Gaelic footballer.
31 March – Jim O'Keeffe, Fine Gael TD for Cork South-West.
18 April – Michael D. Higgins, Labour Party TD, Cabinet Minister and 9th President of Ireland.
22 May – Caitlín Maude, poet, actress and traditional singer (died 1982).
24 June – Gerard Clifford, Roman Catholic auxiliary bishop of the Archdiocese of Armagh.
24 July – Tony Dunne, soccer player.
27 August – Paddy Barry, Cork hurler.
15 September – Tommy Carberry, National Hunt jockey and trainer (died 2017).
18 September – Michael Hartnett, poet (died 1999).
2 October – Donal Moynihan, Fianna Fáil TD.
5 October – Phil Larkin, Kilkenny hurler.
13 October – Mick Doyle, rugby player and coach (died in car crash 2004).
20 October – Mike Murphy, television and radio broadcaster.
11 November – Eddie Keher, Kilkenny hurler.
23 November – Derek Mahon, poet (died 2020).
1 December – Fiachra Trench, musician and composer.
2 December – William Lee, Bishop of Waterford and Lismore (1993– ).
10 December – Fionnula Flanagan, actress. (Fionnghuala Manon Flanagan)
Full date unknown
Jonathan Bardon, historian and author.
James Coleman, installation and video artist.
Cyril Dunne, Galway Gaelic footballer.
Paddy Flanagan, cyclist (died 2000).
Eamon Grennan, poet.
Sean Matgamna, Trotskyist theorist.

Deaths
6 January – F. R. Higgins, poet and theatre director (born 1896).
10 January – John Lavery, artist (born 1856).
13 January – James Joyce, writer and poet (born 1882).
15 February – Andrew Jameson, public servant, businessman and Seanad member (born 1855).
19 February – Hamilton Harty, conductor and composer (born 1879).
13 March – Finlay Jackson, cricketer and rugby player (born 1901).
1 April – Jennie Wyse Power, member of the Seanad from 1922 to 1936.
19 May – Lola Ridge, anarchist poet and editor (born 1873).
4 July – William John English, recipient of the Victoria Cross for gallantry in 1901 at Vlakfontein, South Africa (born 1882).
19 August – John T. Browne, Mayor of Houston, Texas (born 1845).
9 September – William Gerard Barry, painter (born 1864).
11 September – John MacLoughlin, elected for 9 years to Seanad from 1922 as an Independent.
11 October – Mildred Anne Butler, painter (born 1858).
26 November – James Jackman, recipient of the Victoria Cross for gallantry in 1941 at Tobruk, Libya; killed in action the next day (born 1916).
Full date unknown
Sidney Royse Lysaght, writer (born 1856).

References

 
Independent Ireland in World War II
1940s in Ireland
Ireland
Years of the 20th century in Ireland